Naoyuki Ohmura (大村 直之, born February 13, 1976, in Nishinomiya, Hyōgo) is a professional baseball player for the Orix Buffaloes in Japan's Nippon Professional Baseball.

External links

1976 births
Living people
People from Nishinomiya
Japanese baseball players
Nippon Professional Baseball outfielders
Kintetsu Buffaloes players
Osaka Kintetsu Buffaloes players
Fukuoka SoftBank Hawks players
Orix Buffaloes players